David Morgan Evans (21 April 1911 – 24 May 1941) was a Welsh rugby union, and professional rugby league footballer who played in the 1930s.

Background
David Evans was born in Glynneath, Wales, he joined the Royal Navy as a stoker 2nd Class during World War II, and died aged 30 in the Denmark Strait, between Iceland and Greenland, when HMS Hood was sunk in the Battle of the Denmark Strait by the German battleship Bismarck on Saturday 24 May 1941.

Playing career

International honours
David Evans had an unsuccessful trial for Wales (RU), but won caps for Wales (RL) while at Huddersfield in the 3–2 victory over England at Taff Vale Park, Pontypridd, on Saturday 7 November, and in the 9–3 victory over France at Stade de Paris on Sunday 6 December 1936.

County Cup Final appearances
David Evans right-, i.e. number 10, in Huddersfield's 18–10 victory over Hull F.C. in the 1938 Yorkshire County Cup Final during the 1938–39 season at Odsal Stadium, Bradford on Saturday 22 October 1938.

References

External links
(archived by web.archive.org) Neath Rugby Remembers
Memorials to Men Lost in the Sinking of Hood, 24 May 1941
(archived by web.archive.org) Neath RFC Remembers - First World War
(archived by web.archive.org) Neath Rugby Remembers

1911 births
1941 deaths
Welsh military personnel
Royal Navy personnel killed in World War II
Deaths due to shipwreck at sea
Footballers who switched code
Glynneath RFC players
Huddersfield Giants players
Neath RFC players
Rugby union players from Glynneath
Royal Navy sailors
Rugby league players from Neath Port Talbot
Rugby league props
Rugby union forwards
Wales national rugby league team players
Welsh rugby league players
Welsh rugby union players